Cometas Por El Cielo (Kites Across The Sky), is the sixth studio album by La Oreja de Van Gogh which was released on 13 September 2011 under Sony Music. It is the second album by LOVG that is not produced by Nigel Walker. Simon Nordberg handled the production. The album departs from previous efforts as an electropop and power pop record.

It was released in two physical editions, standard and special, and two online editions, on iTunes and Spotify. All the editions differ on the bonus track. The standard edition does not contain a bonus track (unlike almost every album by the band, which include a hidden track), the rest of them has each one a different song as a bonus track.

The album art was drawn by Serge Birault aka PapaNinja.

Track listing

Year End Charts
The album peaked #1 in Spain, being certified Platinum (60.000 copies sold).

Certifications

References

2011 albums
La Oreja de Van Gogh albums
Spanish-language albums